Aiphanes lindeniana is a species of palm that is endemic to Colombia.  Although widespread in the Cordillera Occidental and Cordillera Central, it is threatened by habitat loss and forest management practices.

Description
Individuals are usually multi-stemmed, with up to 10 stems, but occasionally are single-stemmed. Stems bear 4 to 10 leaves which consists of a leaf sheath, a petiole and a rachis. Leaves each bear 18 to 48 pairs of leaflets.

The female flowers are slightly larger— long. The fruit are red or orange  in diameter.

Taxonomy
The species was first described by German botanist Hermann Wendland in 1857 as Martinezia lindeniana.  In 1878 Wendland transferred it to the genus Aiphanes.

Common names
Common names include cuaro, cuvaro and mararai.

Distribution and status
Aiphanes lindeniana is endemic to Colombia.  It is widely distributed along the Cordilleras Occidental and Central in humid, high-elevation forests.  Although it is often spared when areas are deforested, it appears to be unable to reproduce by seed in these areas.  Due to expanding agriculture and forestry operations in its native range, it is considered a vulnerable species.

References

lindeniana
Endemic flora of Colombia
Vulnerable plants
Taxonomy articles created by Polbot